Hip Cake Walk is an album by organist Don Patterson recorded in 1964 and released on the Prestige label.

Reception

Allmusic writer Eugene Chadbourne awarded the album 4 stars stating "Organist Don Patterson went through a richly productive period in the '60s, fashioning a fortress of funky organ jazz hi-fi on the Prestige label" and noting the album has "special status".

Track listing 
All compositions by Don Patterson except as noted
 "Sister Ruth" - 5:00   
 "Donald Duck" - 5:45   
 "Rosetta" - 7:15   
 "Hip Cake Walk" - 16:40   
 "Under the Boardwalk" (Kenny Young, Arthur Resnick) - 2:50  
Recorded at Van Gelder Studio in Englewood Cliffs, New Jersey on May 12 (track 4) and July 10 (tracks 1-3 & 5), 1964

Personnel 
Don Patterson - organ
Booker Ervin - tenor saxophone (tracks 1-4)
Leonard Houston - alto saxophone (track 4) 
Billy James - drums

References 

Don Patterson (organist) albums
Booker Ervin albums
1964 albums
Prestige Records albums
Albums produced by Ozzie Cadena
Albums recorded at Van Gelder Studio